The following table compares features of dosimeters.

References

Literature 
 
 
 

 
Dosimeters
Ionising radiation detectors